Donald James Weekes (born 8 May 1930) is a former English cricketer.  Weekes was a right-handed batsman who bowled right-arm fast.  He was born at Horsham, Sussex.

Weekes made a single first-class appearance for Sussex against Oxford University at University Parks, Oxford in 1952.  In a drawn match, he bowled a total of six wicketless overs, while in his only batting innings he was dismissed for a duck by Henry Joynt.  This was his only major appearance for Sussex.

His uncle is the West Indian Test cricketer Sir Everton Weekes, while his father-in-law, Leonard Bates, played first-class cricket for Warwickshire.

References

External links
Donald Weekes at ESPNcricinfo
Donald Weekes at CricketArchive

1930 births
Living people
People from Horsham
English cricketers
Sussex cricketers
English people of Barbadian descent